Ayubia National Park, also known as Ayubia, is a protected area of  located in Abbottabad District, Khyber Pakhtunkhwa province, Pakistan. It was declared a national park in 1984. Ayubia was named after Muhammad Ayub Khan (1958–1969), second President of Pakistan.
Ayubia National Park is surrounded by seven major villages and three small towns of Thandiani, Nathiagali and Khanspur. The park has been developed as a resort complex from a combination of four mini resorts of Khaira Gali, Changla Gali, Khanspur and Ghora Dhaka in Galyat. Currently, it is managed by the Wildlife and Parks Department of Government of Khyber Pakhtunkhwa.

History
Ayubia National Park was established in 1984 in an east corner of Khyber Pakhtunkhwa province of Pakistan. Since then it has been managed by the Khyber Pakhtunkhwa Wildlife Department. The purpose of establishing it was to conserve the temperate forests.

The total population of Ayubia and surrounding villages as per a 1996 census is 18,097 people living in 2,311 households.

Climate

The climate of the park is cool in the summers, but harsh in the winters. While it remains only placidly hot in May and June, the cold sets in when the monsoons come to lash in late July and early August. In the winters cold increases in severity gradually until the west winds bring rains, which eventually turn into snow. The park remains snow-capped through the later part of winters.
Rainfall: 1,644 mm
Temperature: 3 °C - 11 °C

Wildlife

The park holds 104 species of plants. The main floral species are Cedrus deodara, blue pine, yew, silver fir, horse chestnut and oak. Around 21 plants belonging to 19 families are known for their medicinal properties. Many of these are used in treatment of jaundice, stomach ulcers, snake bites, internal infections, diabetes, psoriasis and more. Some plants are said to have anti-carcinogenic effect as well. Also, some are used as biological insecticides and pesticides, mostly due to their insect-repellent nature. The World Wide Fund for Nature has launched an ethno-botanical initiative here "to demonstrate the sustainable use of plant resources as a means for protecting biodiversity.
There are 23 mammals, 203 birds and 13 herpto-fauna in the park.
Mammals found in the park include:
Indian leopard,P.p.millardi
Leopard cat,F.b.himalayana
Golden jackal,C.a.indicus
Red fox,V.v.griffithi
Yellow-throated marten,M.f.flaviugula
Masked palm civet,P.l.himalayana
Asian palm civet,P.h.isabellinus
Central European boar,S.s.scrofa
Java pipistrelle,P.j.himalayensis
Big-eared horseshoe bat,R.macrotis
Serotine bat,E.serotinus
Rhesus macaque,M.m.villosa
Indian porcupine,H.i.blandfordi
Kashmir field mouse,Apodemus rusiges
Ward's field mouse,Apodemus wardi
Turkestan rat,R.turkestanicus
Murree vole,H.wyneii
Kashmir flying squirrel,E.fimbriatus
Red giant flying squirrel,P.p.albiventer

Some of the Himalayan specialty birds of Ayubia include:
Kalij pheasant,L.l.hamiltonii
Koklass pheasant,P.m.biddulphi
Wedge-tailed green pigeon,T.sphenurus
Speckled wood pigeon,Columba hodgsonii
Spotted dove,S.chinensis
Great barbet,M.virens
Himalayan cuckoo,C.saturatus
Crested serpent-eagle,S.cheela
Besra,A.virgatus
Golden eagle,A.c.daphanea
Himalayan black-lored tit,M.xanthogenys
White-cheeked tit,A.leucogenys
Kashmir nuthatch,Sitta cashmirensis

Management
The park has been managed by Khyber Pakhtunkhwa Wildlife Department under the 1975 Khyber Pakhtunkhwa Wildlife Act. The headquarters of the park is at Dunga Gali, which is situated at a distance of 50 km from Abbottabad and 25 km from Murree.

Tourism
Standing at some 26 kilometers from the tourist hotbed of Murree Hill Station, over 100,000 tourists flock to Ayubia National Park and the places around every year. It is well known for its picnic spots.

This National Park also features the "Pipeline Walking Track" that runs from Ayubia to Nathiagali and is 4 kilometers in length.

Since there are 7 villages and 4 major towns around it, and since this area attracts a very large number of tourists annually, there is a large number of hotels and restaurants around the park. In addition to riding trails, hiking places, picnic spots and motels, there is a chairlift in Ayubia that takes the tourists to a nearby summit called Mukeshpuri for a view of the forested hills. This chairlift was the first recreation facility of its kind in Pakistan and is still a major attraction for domestic tourists. The famous PTDC motel is located here.

Gallery

See also
List of national parks of Pakistan

References

External links

 WDPA Profile
 Description at wildlifeofpakistan.com
 History, information and photos of Murree (Ayubia included)
 Ayubia National Park pictures and videos
 WWF Pakistan - Ayubia page
 Pakistan factbook

National parks of Pakistan
Abbottabad District
Protected areas of Khyber Pakhtunkhwa
Protected areas established in 1984
Parks in Khyber Pakhtunkhwa